The Cederberg ghost frog  (Heleophryne depressa), also known as the Hex River ghost frog or Hex River torrent frog, is a species of frog in the family Heleophrynidae. It is endemic to the Western Cape Province of South Africa, living in the Cederberg mountain range.

References

Heleophryne
Endemic amphibians of South Africa
Amphibians described in 1946
Taxa named by Vivian Frederick Maynard FitzSimons
Taxonomy articles created by Polbot
Fauna of South Africa
Endemic fauna of South Africa